Erin James is an Australian actress.  She was nominated for the 2014 AACTA Award for Best Actress in a Supporting Role for her role in The Little Death. The Little Death was her first film after working in theatre. Her stage credits include touring internationally with the musical Cats.

References

External links
 Erin James
 

Australian film actresses
Australian stage actresses
Living people
Year of birth missing (living people)